{{DISPLAYTITLE:C23H21NO}}
The molecular formula C23H21NO (molar mass: 327.42 g/mol, exact mass: 327.1623 u) may refer to:

 JWH-015
 JWH-073
 JWH-120

Molecular formulas